Colossochares is an Afrotropical genus of water scavenger beetle in the family Hydrophilidae represented by two described species.

Taxonomy 
The genus Colossochares was created in 2021 to group two species of Afrotropical water scavenger beetles in the subfamily Acidocerinae that were formerly placed in the genus Helochares.

Evidence for separating these species from Helochares and constituting a new genus was provided by molecular data.

Description 
Relatively large beetles (8.5–14.0 mm), dark brown in coloration, very convex in lateral view. A diagnosis of the genus was presented by Girón and Short.

Species 

 Colossochares ellipticus (d'Orchymont, 1933) 
 Colossochares satoi (Hebauer, 2003)

References 

Hydrophilidae